Ilya Yevgenyevich Korotkov (born 6 December 1983) is a Russian javelin thrower.

He represented Russia at the Olympics at the 2008 Beijing Olympics and finished seventh in the final. The following year he took silver at the inaugural European Team Championships in Leiria, Portugal, but he could not repeat his medal success at the 2009 World Championships in Athletics, where he failed to make the final of the event.

At the start of the 2010 season, he threw personal best of 85.47 m in Alder, Russia, and continued his good form by throwing 83.28 m to win the gold at the 2010 European Cup Winter Throwing meeting.

International competitions

Seasonal bests by year
2004 - 77.91
2005 - 76.31
2006 - 78.23
2007 - 83.94
2008 - 84.04
2009 - 83.24
2010 - 85.47
2011 - 74.66
2012 - 79.61
2013 - 74.23
2014 - 79.34
2015 - 74.60

References

1983 births
Living people
Russian female javelin throwers
Olympic female javelin throwers
Olympic athletes of Russia
Athletes (track and field) at the 2008 Summer Olympics
Athletes (track and field) at the 2012 Summer Olympics
Competitors at the 2007 Summer Universiade
World Athletics Championships athletes for Russia
Russian Athletics Championships winners